The Cubatãozinho River is a river of Paraná state in southern Brazil.

The river rises in the  Guaricana National Park, created in 2014, which protects a mountainous area of Atlantic Forest.
The Lagoa do Parado Municipal Nature Park, which protects an area of marshland rich in biodiversity, lies on the left bank of the river.

See also
List of rivers of Paraná

References

Sources

Rivers of Paraná (state)